The long-eared jerboa (Euchoreutes naso) is a nocturnal mouse-like rodent with a long tail, long hind legs for jumping, and exceptionally large ears. It is distinct enough that authorities consider it to be the only member of both its genus, Euchoreutes, and subfamily, Euchoreutinae.

Long-eared jerboas are found in the Palearctic ecozone. The specific palearctic ecozone areas they are found in are southernmost Mongolia to the Takla-Makan Desert, Mengxin, Aerijin Mountain, and Qing-Zang Plateau regions of north western China. Long-eared jerboas in most cases are nocturnal, The long-eared jerboa's fur according to the book 100 animals to see before they die "is reddish yellow to pale russet with white underparts." Very little is known about the species.

Description
Long-eared jerboas usually eat insects. They use sound to locate and capture them by performing fast leaps into the air. According to animal diversity web "The two lateral digits are shorter than the three central ones. The central metatarsals are fused for a small distance. The feet are covered with tufts of bristly hairs. Long-eared jerboas have ears that are 1/3 longer than their heads. The incisors are thin and white. A small premolar can be found on each side of the upper jaw. Females have eight mammae." Their fur is light reddish/brown with a white underside. Their tails are covered in fine hairs the same color as their body and have a black and white tuft on the end.

Conservation
The long-eared jerboa was identified as one of the top-10 "focal species" in 2007 by the Evolutionarily Distinct and Globally Endangered (EDGE) project.

In 2007 Zoological Society of London EDGE of Existence Programme sent a researcher to study human impact on its environment. The study returned with video footage that has been noted as the "first time" the creature has been "recorded on camera". This has helped to start a campaign to protect them.

References

9. www.theanimalfiles.com

External links
 EDGE of Existence "(Long-eared jerboa)" Saving the World's most Evolutionarily Distinct and Globally Endangered (EDGE) species

Mammals described in 1891
Dipodidae
EDGE species
Mammals of Mongolia
Rodents of China
Taxa named by Philip Sclater